Chulo may refer to:

Majo, the male version of Maja in traditional Madrid
Tsulosan or Chu-lô-san, former name of Chiayi, Taiwan
"Chulo", a song by Bad Gyal